The Adventures of Huck Finn is a 1993 American comedy drama adventure film written and directed by Stephen Sommers, and starring Elijah Wood, Courtney B. Vance, Jason Robards and Robbie Coltrane. Distributed by Walt Disney Studios Motion Pictures and Buena Vista Pictures, it is based on Mark Twain's 1884 novel Adventures of Huckleberry Finn and focuses on at least three-fourths of the book. 

The film follows a boy named Huckleberry Finn and an escaped slave named Jim, who travel the Mississippi River together and overcome various obstacles along the way.

Plot

Huckleberry Finn is a half-literate son of Pap Finn, a drunk. One night, his father arrives, and Huck is taken away from his foster family to his father's home. Jealous of Huck's money being kept away, he attacks Huck, but eventually passes out from exhaustion.

Huck fakes his own death and runs away. He is accompanied by Jim, a slave who worked for Huck's foster family, and escaped the family after a slave trader offered to buy him. The duo follow the Mississippi River to Cairo, Illinois, so Jim can escape to freedom without being arrested.

They come across a wanted poster for Jim, falsely saying that he murdered Huck. Jim and Huck come across a sinking barge one night, and Jim notices Huck's father's corpse on the ship. Huck notices two robbers leaving one to drown in a room as the water comes crashing through. Huck and Jim's canoe sinks, but they steal the robber's raft, as the barge completely sinks underwater.

The raft is later struck by a steamboat, and Huck is at first captured by a few men, then taken to the home of the Graingerford family. Huck lies about his life to the Graingerfords to avoid suspicion. The Graingerfords are in a feud with another family, the Shepherdsons. Huck even befriends Billy Graingerford, the Graingerford patriarch's son, but is horrified that Jim has been found by the family and has become a slave. Billy's older sister Sophie runs away to marry a Shepherdson, thus a short firefight happens, killing all the male Graingerfords, including Billy.

Jim and Huck find themselves past Cairo, and two con men: The Duke and The King, join Huck and Jim. The quartet land at Phelps Landing, and The King and The Duke impersonate British members of the Wilkes family to con three sisters, Mary Jane, Julia, and Susan, out of their fortune.

Meanwhile, Jim has been taken to prison for Huck's murder, and tells Huck about his dead father, thus Huck rebukes Jim. Huck puts the money in the coffin of a recently deceased Wilkes family member. He exposes The King and The Duke as con men to Mary Jane the next day, and tells her not to tell the town until 10:00 that night, when a steamboat to Cairo departs.

Dr. Robinson doesn't trust The King and The Duke's scheme, and the real members of the family, whom The King and The Duke were impersonating, show up. The town dig up the buried coffin where the money was put, and thus tar and feather The Duke and The King, and become an angry mob. Huck breaks Jim out of prison, but they are spotted by the mob.

While escaping, Huck is shot in the back. Jim sacrifices his chance to escape to freedom and carries Huck to the mob, allowing himself to be hanged. Before the mob can hang Jim, however, Mary Jane, Julia, and Susan arrive and stop the hanging from happening. The mob sets Jim free, and Huck passes out.

Huck wakes up in the Wilkes homestead and learns that Jim's master Miss Watson, who was also one of Huck's caretakers, died, setting Jim free in her will. The other caretaker plans on civilizing Huck, but Huck, narrating the story, says, "I've been there before." The film ends with Huck running off into the sunset.

Cast
 Elijah Wood as Huckleberry "Huck" Finn
 Courtney B. Vance as Jim
 Robbie Coltrane as The Duke
 Jason Robards as The King
 Ron Perlman as Pap Finn
 Dana Ivey as Widow Douglas
 Mary Louise Wilson as Miss Watson
 Anne Heche as Mary Jane Wilks
 James Gammon as Deputy Hines
 Paxton Whitehead as Harvey Wilks
 Tom Aldredge as Dr. Robinson
 Renee O'Connor as Julia Wilks
 Laura Bundy as Susan Wilks
 Curtis Armstrong as Country Jake
 Frances Conroy as Scrawny Shanty Woman
 Daniel Tamberelli as Ben Rodgers
 Garette Ratliff Henson as Billy Grangerford

Production
Principal photography for The Adventures of Huck Finn took place from August 26 to October 23, 1992 in Natchez, Mississippi.  The first day of filming was interrupted by the arrival of Hurricane Andrew which forced the shoot indoors at the Twin Oaks mansion. The Dunleith Historic Inn served as the "Grangerford" estate in the film. Additional filming took place at the Rosalie Mansion, Santon Hall, Under the Hill Saloon, and the Natchez Garden Pilgrimage Club. An onscreen kiss between Wood and Bundy was filmed but not included in the final film.

Music
Bill Conti's score to The Adventures of Huck Finn was released in 1993 by Varèse Sarabande.

Track listing

Main Title 4:43
Missy Finn Goes Shoppin' 2:42
Next Of Kin 2:01
Do The Right Thang 2:48
Once A Slave... 3:26
We're Still Friends 2:43
Billy Gets Killed 2:19
The Barge 2:43
Huck Springs Jim 3:15
All's Well 4:25

Reception
The Adventures of Huck Finn was a financial success, debuting at number two at the box office, and grossing over $24 million.

The film received generally positive reviews from critics, and currently holds a 75% "fresh" rating at review aggregate Rotten Tomatoes based on 16 reviews. Noted critic Roger Ebert gave the film 3 out of 4 stars, writing "The story of Huck and Jim has been told in six or seven earlier movies, and now comes The Adventures of Huck Finn, a graceful and entertaining version by a young director named Stephen Sommers, who doesn't dwell on the film's humane message, but doesn't avoid it, either."

Home media
The film was released on VHS and LaserDisc on November 24, 1993. The DVD was released on January 15, 2002, On February 10, 2009 the film was released double feature with Tom and Huck (1995).

See also

List of films featuring slavery

References

External links 

 
 
 

1993 films
1990s English-language films
1990s adventure comedy-drama films
1990s coming-of-age comedy-drama films
American adventure comedy-drama films
American children's adventure films
American children's comedy films
American coming-of-age comedy-drama films
Children's comedy-drama films
Films about friendship
Films based on adventure novels
Films based on Adventures of Huckleberry Finn
Films directed by Stephen Sommers
Films produced by Laurence Mark
Films scored by Bill Conti
Films set in the 19th century
Films set in the United States
Films with screenplays by Stephen Sommers
Walt Disney Pictures films
1993 comedy films
1993 drama films
1990s American films